The Great Liberal Union ( (GUL) is a right-wing Nicaraguan political party (never legally registered) formed by President Bolaños and other dissidents from the Constitutionalist Liberal Party (PLC) in 2004. After signing an electoral alliance with the Conservative Party, both organizations formed the Alliance for the Republic (APRE) in 2005. As of 2006, the GUL joined the Constitutionalist Liberal Party alliance.

Sources
Revista Envío
La Prensa (in Spanish)
El Nuevo Diario (in Spanish)
2004 establishments in Nicaragua
Political parties established in 2004
Political parties in Nicaragua
Right-wing parties in South America